Ulek may refer to:

Sambal ulek, a paste made of red chilis and salt
Ulek mayang, pre-Islamic religious folk dance of Malaysia

Ulek may also refer to:

The Ulek States, a group of fictional nations in the World of Greyhawk campaign setting for the Dungeons & Dragons role-playing game, including:
The County of Ulek
The Duchy of Ulek
The Principality of Ulek